Park Bench with Steve Buscemi was an American web series talk show created, directed and hosted by actor Steve Buscemi, distributed by digital network AOL. The series premiered on May 15, 2014. In each episode, Buscemi interviews a famous friend, former co-worker or everyday person in New York City.

Production
The show was conceived when Buscemi met Gino Orlando, his sidekick on the series, while directing promotional shorts for Vampire Weekend. "When we saw the footage," Buscemi said, "Geo was so natural and just a great sidekick, if you will, that I said to my producing partner and our producing team, 'I think I can build a whole show out of Geo and I on park benches.'" His brother Michael Buscemi appears as a rival talk show host.

Each season was shot digitally in five days, in interior and exterior locations. The titular bench is a prop brought to each filming location, including the Metropolitan Museum of Art, Julian Schnabel's home and various bars and restaurants in the New York area.

Awards
In September 2016, the series won the Primetime Emmy Award for Outstanding Short Form Variety Series. The win was Buscemi's first out of eight Emmy nominations. The series had been nominated for Outstanding Short-Format Nonfiction Program in 2014.

Episodes

Season 1 (2014)

Season 2 (2015)

References

External links
 
 

American comedy web series
2014 web series debuts
2015 web series endings
Web talk shows
American non-fiction web series